Diego Armando Willis Orozco (born May 11, 1999) is a Mexican professional basketball player for the Libertadores de Querétaro of the Liga Nacional de Baloncesto Profesional (LNBP). He played college basketball for the NJIT Highlanders and the Stephen F. Austin Lumberjacks. He has played for the Mexico men's national basketball team.

Youth career
Due to an impressive performance at the "200 mil Estudiantes por México" youth tournament, Willis received a scholarship to play at the Canarias Basketball Academy in Spain in 2014. He averaged 18.2 points and 4.6 rebounds per game in his final year. He signed a National Letter of Intent to go to NJIT.

College career
As a junior, Willis averaged 5.9 points and 3.3 rebounds per game. Following the season, he transferred to Stephen F. Austin.

Professional career
Willis joined the Libertadores de Querétaro of the Mexican Liga Nacional de Baloncesto Profesional after coming out of ccollege. He made his professional debut in a 93–80 loss to the Fuerza Regia de Monterrey on July 22. Willis was named the 2022 Rookie of the Year.

National team career
Willis was first called up to the Mexico national team for the 2017 FIBA AmeriCup. Willis represented Mexico in the 2019 Pan American Games.

Career statistics

College

|-
| style="text-align:left;"| 2018–19
| style="text-align:left;"| NJIT
| 28 || 1 || 9.7 || .322 || .310 || .333 || 1.5 || .6 || .2 || .0 || 1.9
|-
| style="text-align:left;"| 2019–20
| style="text-align:left;"| NJIT
| 30 || 2 || 14.5 || .330 || .280 || .650 || 1.8 || .8 || .4 || .1 || 3.5
|-
| style="text-align:left;"| 2020–21
| style="text-align:left;"| NJIT
| 19 || 5 || 21.6 || .330 || .250 || .795 || 3.3 || .9 || .6 || .0 || 5.9
|- class="sortbottom"
| style="text-align:center;" colspan="2"| Career
| 77 || 8 || 14.5 || .328 || .277 || .726 || 2.1 || .8 || .4 || .1 || 3.5

Personal life
His father, Rafael, represented Mexico in Basketball at the 1991 Pan American Games while his mother was a volleyball player.

References

External links
Stephen F. Austin Lumberjacks bio
NJIT Highlanders bio
Diego Willis at RealGM

1999 births
Living people
Basketball players at the 2019 Pan American Games
Basketball players from Sonora
Guards (basketball)
Libertadores de Querétaro players
Mexican expatriate basketball people in Spain
Mexican expatriate basketball people in the United States
Mexican men's basketball players
NJIT Highlanders men's basketball players
Sportspeople from Hermosillo
Pan American Games competitors for Mexico